(lit. "the large grammar of Finnish") is a reference book of Finnish grammar. It was published in 2004 by the Finnish Literature Society and to this date is the most extensive of its kind.

The 1,698 page book differs from earlier grammars by taking a descriptive approach and describing colloquial Finnish in addition to standard literary Finnish.

The entire work is also freely available online.

External links
 Complete online version of the work (in Finnish)

2004 non-fiction books
Finnish grammar
Grammar books